King of the Pecos is a 1936 American Western film directed by Joseph Kane and starring John Wayne and Muriel Evans.

Cast
 John Wayne as John Clayborn
 Muriel Evans as Belle Jackson
 Cy Kendall as Alexander Stiles
 Jack Clifford as Henchman Ash
 Arthur Aylesworth as Hank Mathews 
 Herbert Heywood as Josh Billings
 J. Frank Glendon as Lawyer Brewster 
 Edward Hearn as Eli Jackson
 John Beck as Mr. Clayborn
 Mary MacLaren as Mrs. Clayborn
 Bradley Metcalfe as Little John
 Yakima Canutt as Henchman Pete

See also
 John Wayne filmography

References

External links
 

1936 films
1936 drama films
1936 Western (genre) films
American Western (genre) films
American black-and-white films
Films directed by Joseph Kane
Films set in Texas
Films with screenplays by Bernard McConville
Republic Pictures films
1930s English-language films
1930s American films